Le Voyou, also known as The Crook, is a 1970 French action film which follows Simon the Swiss during his largest heist. Directed by Claude Lelouch in 1970, and starring Jean-Louis Trintignant, the film makes use of several cinematic techniques to convey the elusive nature of the title character, including a circular narrative, dialogue littered with conflicting statements, flashbacks, musical montage, multiple styles of film editing, misaligned sound editing, and movie within the movie.

Awards 

The film won the David di Donatello for Best Foreign Direction in 1971.

Cast
 Jean-Louis Trintignant as Simon Duroc, or "The Swiss"
 Danièle Delorme as Janine
 Charles Gérard as Charlot
 Christine Lelouch as Martine
 Charles Denner as Mr Gallois
 Amidou as Bill
 Judith Magre as Mrs Gallois

References

External links

1970 films
1970s crime films
French heist films
Films directed by Claude Lelouch
United Artists films
Films scored by Francis Lai
1970s heist films
1970s French films